Mindomys is a genus of sigmodontine rodents in the family Cricetidae. It includes two species known only from Ecuador, Hammond's rice rat (Mindomys hammondi) and the Kutukú rat (Mindomys kutuku).

See also

 List of mammals of Ecuador

References

Oryzomyini
Rodent genera
Endemic fauna of Ecuador
Mammals of Ecuador